Nattō is a Japanese food made from fermented soybeans.

Natto may also refer to;
 Bacillus natto (B. natto), a gram-positive bacteria
 Natto Wada (1920-1983), Japanese screenwriter
 Mimi Natto (mangaka), Japanese author published in Monthly Magazine Z
 Kapi Natto MBE, a Papua New Guinea person honoured at the 2009 Birthday Honours
 John Kappi Natto, president of the Papua New Guinea Football Association
 NUT (studio) Japanese animation studio

See also

 
 
 Nato (disambiguation)